The 4th LINE TV Awards was an awarding ceremony presented by LINE TV Thailand giving recognition to the Thai online entertainment industry in the fields of music, television, and drama for their achievements in the year 2020.

The nominees were revealed on 21 June, while the online voting for most of the categories occurred from 21 June to 18 July. The award show was held on August 5 through virtual and with no in-person venue due to the COVID-19 pandemic. It was streamed through Line TV app and website.

Awards 
Winners are listed first and highlighted in bold:

Major awards

Special awards

Multiple nominations

References 

2021
Line
Line
2021
2021